Llanarth is a locality in the Bathurst Region of New South Wales, Australia, approximately  from Bathurst. It was named after the historic Llanarth property, established in 1858 by the Smith family after their previous home of Llanarth in Cornwall.

The area has been subject to large-scale residential development in recent years.

Heritage listings
Llanarth has a number of heritage-listed sites, including:
 120 Eglington Road: Llanarth

References

Localities in New South Wales
Bathurst Region